Lukáš Pollert (born 24 March 1970 in Prague) is a Czech slalom canoeist who competed from the late 1980s to the early 2000s. Competing in two Summer Olympics, he won two medals in the C1 event with a gold in 1992 and a silver in 1996.

Pollert also won a silver medal in the C1 event at the 1997 ICF Canoe Slalom World Championships in Três Coroas and the overall World Cup title in the C1 category in 1993. At the European Championships he won a total of four medals (2 silvers and 2 bronzes).

He took part in the Velvet Revolution in 1989 in Czechoslovakia which Pollert later considered more important to him than the gold medal he won at Barcelona three years later.

Being a Doctor of Medicine, Pollert retired in 2000 and is nowadays active in his career of a GP in ER of Prague's Military Hospital. He has published several books of interviews with other top Czech sportsmen ("Lukáš Pollert se ptá") and is an active videoblogger on the Vyladeno.tv website. With his partner, Pavla, he has six children, three sons and three daughters.

His sister is actress Klára Pollertová.

World Cup individual podiums

References

Wallechinsky, David and Jaime Loucky (2008). "Canoeing: Men's Canadian Slalom Singles". In The Complete Book of the Olympics: 2008 Edition. London: Aurum Press Limited. p. 486.

1970 births
Canoeists at the 1992 Summer Olympics
Canoeists at the 1996 Summer Olympics
Czech male canoeists
Czechoslovak male canoeists
Living people
Olympic canoeists of Czechoslovakia
Olympic canoeists of the Czech Republic
Olympic gold medalists for Czechoslovakia
Olympic silver medalists for the Czech Republic
Olympic medalists in canoeing
Medalists at the 1996 Summer Olympics
Medalists at the 1992 Summer Olympics
Medalists at the ICF Canoe Slalom World Championships
Canoeists from Prague